Chalfont & Latimer is a London Underground and National Rail station in Travelcard Zone 8 (previously zone C) on the Metropolitan line, in Buckinghamshire.
It also serves the Chiltern Railways line to Aylesbury. Chalfont & Latimer station is located just before the junction for trains to Chesham.
The station serves Chalfont St Giles, Chalfont St Peter, Little Chalfont and Latimer. It is located in Little Chalfont. It opened as "Chalfont Road" on 8 July 1889 but changed to the present name from 1 November 1915. The station is a good location to alight from to explore the Chess Valley.

History

Chalfont & Latimer station was formerly served by steam–hauled Metropolitan line trains with a changeover to an electric locomotive at Rickmansworth. The electrification north of Rickmansworth to Amersham and Chesham was completed in 1960, with steam trains being finally withdrawn in 1961. British Railways took over the operation of the service north of Amersham at the same time, using Class 115 diesel multiple unit trains.  The station had a goods yard, which closed on 14 November 1966.

From 1961, Metropolitan line trains at Chalfont & Latimer were formed of A60 and A62 Stock. Prior to 11 December 2010, the  branch was served by a single four-car shuttle train (using Chalfont & Latimer station's bay platform), except for two through trains in either direction during peak periods. From 12 December 2010, the Chesham service was formed of eight cars with new S Stock trains being introduced. Chiltern Railways (Aylesbury-Marylebone) trains are formed by Class 165 and Class 168 diesel multiple units.

Services

Metropolitan line
The Metropolitan line is the only line on the London Underground to operate an express service, though currently, this is only southbound in the morning peaks and northbound in the evening peaks. Southbound fast trains run non-stop between Moor Park, Harrow-on-the-Hill and Finchley Road. Southbound semi-fast trains only run non-stop between Harrow-on-the-Hill and Finchley Road. Northbound fast and semi-fast trains call additionally at Wembley Park before running non-stop between the aforementioned stations.

The off-peak service in trains per hour (tph) presently consists of:
4tph to Aldgate (all stations)
2tph to Amersham
2tph to Chesham

The morning peak service in trains per hour (tph) presently consists of:
4tph to Aldgate (fast)
2tph to Aldgate (semi-fast)
4tph to Amersham
2tph to Chesham

The evening service in trains per hour (tph) presently consists of:
2tph to Baker Street (all stations)
4tph to Aldgate via Baker Street (all stations)
4tph to Amersham
2tph to Chesham

Chiltern Railways
Chiltern Railways operate services between London Marylebone and Aylesbury Vale Parkway via Harrow-on-the-Hill station.

Harrow-on-the-Hill is Chiltern Railway's only station between London Marylebone and Rickmansworth.

The off-peak service in trains per hour (tph) presently consists of:
2tph to London Marylebone
1tph to Aylesbury
1tph to Aylesbury Vale Parkway via Aylesbury

Accidents and incidents
On 21 June 2020, a Chiltern Railways train passed a signal at danger, stopped but then proceeded. It ran through and damaged facing points and ended up running on the wrong line, stopping  short of a tube train at the station.  The Rail Accident Investigation Branch report considered the likely cause of the incident was driver fatigue.

References

External links

Metropolitan line stations
Tube stations in Buckinghamshire
Railway stations in Buckinghamshire
Former Metropolitan and Great Central Joint Railway stations
Railway stations in Great Britain opened in 1889
Railway stations served by Chiltern Railways